Stevenstown is a small town situated on the Mokolo River in the Limpopo province of South Africa.

Geography

Location 
The town, unlike other towns in the Limpopo province, is not located on a national road, of which the nearest one is at Nylstroom/Modimolle. It does however lie halfway on a road stretching from Nylstroom/Modimolle to Ellisras/Lephalale (the R33 Route). Nearby towns also include Hermanusdorings, Melkrivier, Palala and Naboomspruit.

Geography 

It lies at the southern edge of the rugged Waterberg Massif, which is a biosphere that contains considerable biodiversity, including numerous large mammals (e.g. Giraffe, White Rhino, Blue Wildebeest).  Waterberg is the first region in the northern part of South Africa to be named as a Biosphere Reserve by  UNESCO.   The extensive rock formation was shaped by hundreds of millions of years of riverine erosion to yield diverse bluff and butte landform.

Economy

Tourism 
Vaalwater is a popular jumping-off point for travels to the Waterberg Massif and Botswana and is itself becoming a minor destination for tourism.  There are a variety of craft, art, and gift shops, as well as cafes and restaurants. Vaalwater is also home to some of the most magnificent game farms and eco-tourism in the country. Many of the game farms host the Big Five, and nature-lovers will find the mountains, bush and wildlife worth the visit.

Services 
Vaalwater has a number of commercial services not common for kilometres around, especially on roads leading to Botswana.  These include banking, groceries, petrol and diesel, a post office, and doctors.

Name 
In 2006, Vaalwater was officially renamed Mabatlane, but reverted to Vaalwater in 2007 after it became evident that the proper renaming procedures had not been followed.

References

External links 
www.places.co.za/html/vaalwater.html

Populated places in the Modimolle–Mookgophong Local Municipality